Gymnorhamphichthys is a genus of South American sand knifefishes found in the Amazon, Araguaia, Orinoco and Río de la Plata basins, as well as rivers in the Guianas. They inhabit both small streams and large rivers, but usually over a sandy bottom. During the night they swim head-down over the sandy bottom to locate small invertebrate prey like insect larvae and during the day they rest buried under the sand.

They are generally very pale (almost whitish, light silvery, light yellowish or semi-translucent), and have a pattern of dark bars/spots or a dark line along the side of the body. Their snout is relatively long, thin and tubular.

Species
There are currently six recognized species in this genus:

 Gymnorhamphichthys bogardusi Lundberg, 2005
 Gymnorhamphichthys britskii T. P. Carvalho, C. S. Ramos & Albert, 2011
 Gymnorhamphichthys hypostomus M. M. Ellis, 1912
 Gymnorhamphichthys petiti Géry & T. T. Vu, 1964
 Gymnorhamphichthys rondoni (A. Miranda-Ribeiro, 1920)
 Gymnorhamphichthys rosamariae Schwassmann, 1989

References

Rhamphichthyidae
Fish of South America
Freshwater fish genera
Taxa named by Max Mapes Ellis